There are ten metro stations on the Samara Metro system in Samara, Russia.

External links 
List, maps and stations of Samara metro

Stations
Samara
Samara Metro